The C-16 class switchers were the last 0-4-0 steam locomotives built for the Baltimore and Ohio Railroad. They were assigned to the Baltimore, Maryland "Pratt Street Line" along the Inner Harbor, and to the Philadelphia, Pennsylvania waterfront trackage. Initially constructed as saddle tank engines, nos. 96 and 99 were given tenders in later years. After the saddle tank was removed in 1926 they were then given the classification of "C-16A" (Nos. 97 and 98 remained unchanged.) The diminutive size and short wheelbase were required to handle the tight curves of these lines. No. 99 was scrapped in 1944. No. 97 was renumbered 897 in 1950 and scrapped in 1951. No. 98 was renumbered 898 in 1950 and also scrapped in 1951.
 
Nicknamed "Little Joe" by railroad workers, they became famous to several generations of model railroad enthusiasts through construction of HO, S & O scale models of the "Dockside" switcher.  Arguably one of the best known of all steam locomotive models for half a century, versions of the C-16 have been offered by Varney, Rivarossi, Gem, Life-Like, Pacific Fast Mail, MTH and others. They were also used as a model for Trainz Railroad Simulator.

References 

Baldwin locomotives
0-4-0ST locomotives
C-16
Steam locomotives of the United States
Railway locomotives introduced in 1912
Scrapped locomotives

Freight locomotives